Churches Together may refer to:
 Churches Together in Britain and Ireland
 Churches Together in England

or other related ecumenical bodies in Britain and Ireland.